William Michie Klusmeyer (born 1955) is an American Episcopal prelate who was the Bishop of West Virginia from 2001 until 2022.

Biography

Born in Glen Cove, New York, he moved with his family to the Chicago suburbs.  He was educated at Illinois College, in Jacksonville, Illinois, where he majored in Spanish and Elementary Education.  He then attended The General Theological Seminary in New York, where he graduated in 1980.

Having grown up in The Episcopal Church, where he served as a choir member, an acolyte, a Sunday School Teacher, a Lay Reader, and more, he was ordained to the Sacred Order of Deacons by the Rt Rev Quintin E Primo, Jr, Bishop Suffragan of the Diocese of Chicago.  Klusmeyer was appointed to be the Curate at Grace Episcopal Church in Freeport, Illinois.  He was ordained Priest by the Rt  Rev James W Montgomery, Bishop of Chicago.  In early 1982, he was elected Rector of Grace Church, Freeport, where he served until mid-1990.  He was then elected Rector of Trinity Episcopal Church, Wheaton, Illinois.  While there, Trinity became active in homeless ministries, children's ministries as well as Transitional Housing.

In 2001, he was elected the 7th Bishop of The Episcopal Diocese of West Virginia.  He was consecrated Bishop in 2001, by Presiding Bishop Frank Griswold; retired Bishop of West Virginia, Robert P. Atkinson; and (then) current Bishop of Chicago, William Persell.  He serves on the Board of Trustees of The Virginia Seminary, on the Board of The General Theological Seminary, and also served on the Board of the Bexley-Seabury Seminary, where he served as chair of the board from 2012 until 2020.  During his time on the Board, he helped navigate the Federation of the 2 seminaries.

He serves as Honorary Chair of the Reynolds Memorial Hospital Board.

Klusmeyer retired on October 13, 2022,].

See also
 List of Episcopal bishops of the United States
 Historical list of the Episcopal bishops of the United States

References

External links 
Bexley Seabury website
West Virginia diocesan website

Living people
Bishops in West Virginia
1955 births
Episcopal bishops of West Virginia
Trustees of educational establishments